was a Japanese born theater actor.  He was born in Tokyo on June 27, 1949 and attended the Keio University, where he studied law.  While in Japan, he was a member of the Shiki Theatre Company.   
His broadway debut was in the original all Asian cast of Pacific Overtures in 1976 where he played Kayama. He was the only non-American member of the cast.  In fact, he came to America specifically to audition for this role, after having missed the Tokyo auditions for the musical.  Once he was cast, he emigrated to America. Reviews for the show were mixed, but Sato received praise for his performance.   He was nominated for a Tony Award for Best Featured Actor in a Musical in 1976, but lost to Sammy Williams of A Chorus Line. His voice can be heard on the cast recording of Pacific Overtures.  In 1979, he played several roles in the play Fanshen about the Chinese revolution at the ACT Theatre in Seattle.  He later played Wenqing in Peking Man, a play by Cao Yu at the Horace Mann Theater in New York City in 1980. At the Perry Street Theater in New York City, he acted in Dick Brukenfeld's historical drama "Extenuating Circumstances", wherein an American man is accused of killing a young Chinese girl in Canton, China in 1821.

Later in his career, he appeared on television in the show Spenser: For Hire on the episode "My Brother's Keeper", where he was reunited with his Pacific Overtures castmate Mako Iwamatsu. In 1987, he played the scientist in Penn & Teller's TV movie "Invisible Thread".

While touring the West coast with Pacific Overtures, he met his wife Janice Kanemitsu, who was a dancer on the tour.  They were married on October 17, 1976 and divorced in 1979.

Sato pursued a second career as a flight instructor and was an instructor at Crest One Flight Academy in Florida.  He died in a plane crash in Miramar, Florida on March 9, 1990.  The Cessna he was in was flown by his student and collided with a banner plane.  He was 40 years old.

References

1949 births
1990 deaths
Japanese male stage actors
American male stage actors
American male television actors
Victims of aviation accidents or incidents in the United States
Male actors from Tokyo
Japanese emigrants to the United States
American male actors of Japanese descent
20th-century American male actors